The Roman Catholic Diocese of Santorini is a diocese located in the city of Santorini in the Ecclesiastical province of Naxos, Andros, Tinos and Mykonos in Greece.

History
 1204: Established as Diocese of Santorini, also called Diocese of Thera

Ordinaries
Agostino (16 Nov 1477 Ordained Bishop - 1494 Died)
... 
Acenario López (31 Mar 1516 - 1521 Died)
Santiago Calatayud, O.S.A. (20 Feb 1521 - 1526 Died)
Rodrigo de Beniambras (11 Mar 1527 - 1535 Died)
Benedetto, O. Cist. (6 Aug 1535 - 1539 Died) 
Dionisio de Avila, O. de M. (29 Oct 1539 - 1552 Died)
Ludovico de Argentis (12 Sep 1552 - ) 
Marco Lauro, O.P. (16 Dec 1555 - 26 Jan 1560 Appointed, Bishop of Satriano e Campagna) 
Domenico di Grammatica (26 Apr 1560 - 1565 Died) 
Bernardo Lauro, O.P. (12 Oct 1565 - 7 Oct 1583 Appointed, Bishop of Milos) 
Angelo di Cipro, O.P. (7 Nov 1583 - 1585 Resigned) 
Bernardo Lauro, O.P. (27 Nov 1585 - 1588 Died) 
Antonio de Marchi (16 Mar 1588 - )
Pietro de Marchi, O.P. (18 Apr 1611 - 19 Feb 1625 Appointed, Archbishop of Izmir) 
Giovanni Maria Galli (bishop), O.F.M. (21 Apr 1625 - ) 
Andrea Soffiani (4 Mar 1630 - 10 Mar 1642 Appointed, Roman Catholic Bishop of Chios) 
Gerolamo de Paduano, O.F.M. (16 Jun 1642 - 26 Dec 1666 Died) 
Francesco Santaggi (14 May 1668 - Aug 1686 Died) 
Giovanni d'Aviani (12 Aug 1686 - 1687 Died) 
Francesco Crispo (24 Nov 1687 - Feb 1714 Died) 
Luigi Guarchi (1 Oct 1714 - 26 Sep 1738 Appointed, Bishop of Tinos) 
Francesco Antonio Razzolini, O.F.M. Conv. (14 Dec 1739 - 7 May 1746 Resigned) 
Domenico Mainetta (19 Dec 1746 - 20 Feb 1758 Resigned) 
Giovanni Battista Crispi (19 Jul 1758 - 12 Jul 1773 Appointed, Archbishop of Naxos) 
Giorgio Stay (12 Jul 1773 - 16 May 1774 Died) 
Pietro Delenda (27 Jun 1774 - 20 Mar 1807 Died) 
Iosephus Maria Tobia, O.F.M. Conv. (21 Feb 1809 - 19 Jul 1815 Died) 
Caspar Delenda (19 Jul 1815 - 16 Sep 1825 Died) 
Luca de Cigalla (15 Dec 1828 - 12 Feb 1847 Died) 
François Cuculla (10 Sep 1847 - 14 Jan 1853 Appointed, Archbishop of Naxos) 
Niccola Adolfo Marinelli (14 Jan 1853 - 9 Dec 1855 Resigned) 
Lorenzo Bergeretti (29 Jul 1856 - 22 Aug 1862 Appointed, Coadjutor Archbishop of Naxos) 
Fedele Abbati (Abati), O.F.M. (27 Mar 1863 - 16 Oct 1877 Resigned) 
Antonio Galibert (4 Feb 1879 - 8 Aug 1906 Died) 
Michele Camilleri (1 Jul 1907 - 19 Mar 1931 Died) 
Timoteo Giorgio Raymundos, O.F.M. Cap. (12 Jan 1932 - 4 May 1945 Resigned) 
Georges Xenopulos, S.J. (22 Feb 1947 - 27 Jun 1974 Retired) 
Frangiskos Papamanolis, O.F.M. Cap. (27 Jun 1974 - 13 May 2014 Retired) 
Petros Stefanou (13 May 2014 -

See also
Roman Catholicism in Greece

References

Roman Catholic dioceses in Greece
Dioceses established in the 13th century
Santorini
1204 establishments in Europe